Night Ride or Nightride may refer to:

Music
 Nightride (album), a 2016 album by Tinashe
 "Nightride", a song by Status Quo from On the Level, 1975
 "Nightride (The Ballad of the Black Patch Riders)", by Legendary Shack Shakers from AgriDustrial
 Nightride, a 1981 album by Cliff Bennett produced by Ian Gillan

Other uses
 Night Ride (1930 film), an American crime film directed by John S. Robertson
 Night Ride (1937 film), a British drama film directed by John Paddy Carstairs
 Night Ride (BBC Radio 2) from 1967–1974 and Radio 2's overnight programme from 1984–1995
 NightRide (bus service), Sydney night bus network
 Nightride, an off-Broadway production with Lester Rawlins

See also
 Night Rider (disambiguation)